Lake Area New Tech Early College High School was a former high school in Gentilly, New Orleans, Louisiana, United States. The New Beginnings Schools Foundation ran the school. The school was established in July 2011 as a result of a merger between Greater Gentilly High School and Thurgood Marshall Early College High School.

The $39 million school building opened in August 2009 as Greater Gentilly High School with capacity for 800 students. It was one of the first built as part of the RSD's $1.8 billion post-Hurricane Katrina facility overhaul.

In December 2017, it was announced that the school was closing and would reopen as John F. Kennedy High School on the same campus starting in July 2018.

References

External links

Official website

Defunct charter schools in New Orleans
Defunct public high schools in New Orleans
Educational institutions established in 2011
2011 establishments in Louisiana
2017 disestablishments in Louisiana